Christoph Sauter (born 3 August 1991) is a German former professional footballer who played as a striker.

External links
 
 

1991 births
Living people
Association football forwards
German footballers
Germany youth international footballers
1. FSV Mainz 05 II players
1. FC Nürnberg II players
VfR Aalen players
Karlsruher SC players
Rot-Weiss Essen players
3. Liga players
Sportspeople from Ludwigshafen
Footballers from Rhineland-Palatinate